The Thomas P. Costin Jr. Post Office Building, formerly known as the United States Post Office—Lynn Main is a historic post office building at 51 Willow Street in Lynn, Massachusetts.  It still serves as Lynn's central post office.

The two story granite Art Moderne building was built in 1933.  It features a central three-bay entry pavilion that projects slightly from the facade; there are pilaster elements flanking and between the windows of this section.  On either side of the entry are four-bay wings.  The building occupies the entire width of a city block.  Inside, the lobby area is richly colored, with multiple shades of marble used on the floors and decorative wall and ceiling elements.  It also retains a number of original features, such as writing desks and light fixtures.

The building was listed on the National Register of Historic Places in 2002.

In late 2018, the building was renamed by an Act of Congress in honor of Thomas P. Costin Jr., the 45th and youngest Mayor of Lynn, who later served as Postmaster for the Lynn District from 1961 to 1992. The official dedication ceremony was held on May 24, 2019.

See also 

National Register of Historic Places listings in Lynn, Massachusetts
National Register of Historic Places listings in Essex County, Massachusetts
List of United States post offices

References 

Lynn
Buildings and structures in Lynn, Massachusetts
National Register of Historic Places in Lynn, Massachusetts